Mount Ararat is a mountain in Barnstable County, Massachusetts. Oak Head is located west of Mount Ararat.

References

Mountains of Massachusetts
Mountains of Barnstable County, Massachusetts